"Windows Down" is a song by American boy band Big Time Rush from the re-release of their second studio album Elevate. The song was released on June 25, 2012. The song's hook is sampled from "Song 2" by English rock band Blur.

Composition
The song was written by Blackbear, Mike Posner, Alexander James, Damon Albarn, Dave Rowntree, Graham Coxon, Bei Maejor, and Matt Squire, with production handled by the latter two while additional by CJ Baran. It features samples from "Song 2" by Blur. American singer/songwriter Kesha originally created an early demo of the track, expected to appear on her second studio album Warrior with the title "Woo Hoo", still using the Blur sample, but later sold the instrumental to Big Time Rush, and the song was re-written to create "Windows Down".

Music video
The music video was filmed in Maui, Hawaii and was released on Vevo on June 22, three days before the single's iTunes release. The video features the band doing various activities in Hawaii like surfing, paddle boarding, swimming in the ocean, and standing on top of Jeep Wranglers.

Critical reception
Nick Bassett from UK site The Re-View called "Windows Down" a "surefire summer pop hit", complimenting the use of the "Song 2" sample and wrapping up his article saying that it should "mark Big Time Rush as some hot, home-grown competition for our Transatlantic invading boybands".

Track listing
Digital download
"Windows Down" – 3:12

EU CD single
"Windows Down" – 3:13
"Windows Down" (Instrumental) – 2:59

Commercial performance
"Windows Down" peaked at number 97 on Billboard Hot 100 and lasted one week on chart. The song also peaked on Billboard Mainstream Top 40 which lasted 3 weeks on chart.

Charts

Weekly charts

Year-end charts

Certifications

Release history

References

2012 singles
Big Time Rush songs
Columbia Records singles
Songs written by Mike Posner
Song recordings produced by Maejor
Songs written by Maejor
Songs written by Matt Squire
Songs written by Damon Albarn
Songs written by Dave Rowntree
Songs written by Graham Coxon
Songs written by Alex James (musician)
2012 songs
Songs written by Blackbear (musician)